Tar Nawai is a union council and town of Abbottabad District in Khyber-Pakhtunkhwa province of Pakistan. According to the 2017 Census of Pakistan, the population is 10,723.

References

Union councils of Abbottabad District